Luer (also Lüer) is a Germanic surname. It may refer to:

 Carlyle A. Luer (born 1922), American botanist specializing in orchids
 Greg Luer (born 1994), English footballer
 Hermann Wülfing Luer (?–1883), German instrument maker; inventor of the Luer taper
 Hugo Gunckel Lüer (1901–1997), Chilean pharmacist, botanist, and university professor
 Karl-Hermann Lüer (1933–2014), German saxophonist and flautist
 Ludwig Luer ( WWI-era), German flying ace

See also
 Luer taper, a system for making leak-free connections between pieces of medical or laboratory equipment